Manuel Fernández Álvarez (7 November 1921 – 19 April 2010) was a Spanish historian, academic and writer.

Biography 
He was the son of Enrique Fernández and María Álvarez. 

In 1942 he graduated in Philosophy at the University of Valladolid. 

He was professor at the University of Salamanca (and after retirement profesor emérito).

He died on 19 April 2010 aged 88 due to a complication after a heart surgery.

Books 
La sociedad espanola en el Siglo de Oro
La sociedad espanola del Renascimiento, 1985
Carlos V, el cesar y el hombre, 2000
Corpus monumental de Carlos V, Salamanca, 1973-1981
Carlos V: un hombre para Europa
Isabel la Catolica
Felipe II y su tiempo
La Gran Aventura de Cristobal Colon, Espasa Calpe, 2006

References

1921 births
2010 deaths
Writers from Madrid
Members of the Real Academia de la Historia
20th-century Spanish male writers
21st-century male writers
20th-century Spanish historians
Academic staff of the University of Salamanca
University of Valladolid alumni